Ganhoué is a village in the far west of Ivory Coast. It is in the sub-prefecture of Ouaninou, Ouaninou Department, Bafing Region, Woroba District.

Ganhoué was a commune until March 2012, when it became one of 1126 communes nationwide that were abolished.

Notes

Former communes of Ivory Coast
Populated places in Woroba District
Populated places in Bafing Region